Jules Richomme (9 September 1818 – 16 October 1903) was a French portrait, landscape, genre and history painter.

He was a son of the engraver Théodore Richomme.

Jules' daughter was Jeanne Richomme Raunay (1869–1942), lyric artist and wife of André Beaunier.

Life 
Born in Paris, he was a student of Michel Martin Drolling at the Beaux-Arts de Paris. He took part in the Prix de Rome competitions in 1838 and 1840. He was a friend of Charles Gounod.

He also painted historic and religious subjects such as scenes from the life of Joan of Arc, Francis I of France and Jacques Cœur. He exhibited at the Paris Salons from 1833 onwards, including some genre and religious scenes but mainly portraits. He won a third class medal at the 1840 Salon and a second class medal at the 1842 Salon with a recall in 1861 and 1863.

He also painted the chapelle Saint-Vincent-de-Paul in the église Saint-Séverin in 1861. In 1863, he painted the Lady Chapel and baptisteries at the église Notre-Dame de Bercy. He also painted paintings for the Cour d'assises de la Seine in 1868.

He was made a chevalier de la Légion d'honneur in 1867.

Jules Richomme was one of the painters chosen by the French state to decorate the théâtre d'italienne in Cherbourg in 1879.

He died in Paris.

Works exhibited at the Salon 
 Portrait M. A..., avocat - drawing, 1833 Salon,
 Jeune femme et son enfant, 1836 Salon,
 La Sainte Famille - drawing after Raphael, 1837 Salon,
 Portrait de M. A. L..., 1839 Salon,
 Portrait d'homme, 1840 Salon,
 Abraham par le conseil de Sara prend Agar pour femme - Portrait de femme, 1842 Salon,
 Saint Pierre repentant, 1843 Salon,
 Saint Sébastien délivré par les saintes femmes - Portrait du colonel de Saint A... - Portrait d'homme, 1844 Salon,
 Incrédulité de saint Thomas - Portraits des enfants de M. Ch. P..., 1845 Salon,
 Le Christ apparaît à saint Martin, Le repentir de saint Pierre - Léda, 1848 Salon,
 Érigone - La fiancée du roi de Garbe, 1849 Salon,
 Conversion de la Madeleine - Portrait de Mme R... - Portrait de Melle C... - Vue de Saint-Pierre de Rome, vue de la villa Pamfili-Doria - Vue des Casius Corsini et Valentini, rue de la ville Pamfili-Doria à la porte San Pancrace - Vue du pont Lamentano - Vue de la tour de Cervaro (road from Rome to Tivoli), 1850 Salon,
 Mendiante italienne, États Romains, 1852 Salon,
 Jésus guérissant un paralytique - L'Amour fuyant l'ivresse - Portrait de femme, 1853 Salon,
 Notre Seigneur Jésus-Christ guérit une femme malade - Portrait de Mme R... - Portrait de Melle V. T... - Portrait de M. H..., curé de Saint-Séverin - Portrait de M. A. G..., 1855 Salon,
 Saint Nicolas sauvant des matelos - Portrait de M. Leroy de Saint-Arnaud, conseiller d'État, maire du 12e arrondissement, 1857 Salon,
 Portrait de Melle L. S. de L... - Portrait de M. Varé, architecte paysagiste, 1859 Salon,
 Laissez venir à moi les petits enfants - Décoration d'une partie de la chapelle de Saint-Vincent-de-Paul dans l'église Saint-Séverin de Paris sketch - L'étude interrompue - Jeune mère, souvenir d'Italie - Portrait de femme, 1861 Salon,
 Consolatrix afflictorum (for the church at Bercy) - Portrait de M. A. V... - Portrait de Melle C. V..., 1863 Salon,
 Saint Pierre d'Alcantara guérissant un enfant malade réexposé en 1867 - La leçon de lecture, 1864 Salon,
 Le baptême de Jésus-Christ - Portrait d'enfant, 1865 Salon,
 La décollation de saint Jean-Baptiste, 1866 Salon,
 Portrait de M. J. L... - La famille P... portraits en costume Louis XIII, 1867 Salon,
 Christ en croix - Portrait du docteur Charles V..., 1868 Salon,
 Portrait de Mme C..., 1869 Salon,
 Châteaux en Espagne - L'adoration des bergers (carton pour la chapelle de l'Annonciation de la cathédrale de Bordeaux, 1870 Salon,
 Vergiss mein nicht - Portrait d'enfant, 1872 Salon,
 Consolation - L'éducation d'Achille, 1873 Salon,
 Les Tuileries après la Commune watercolour - Le Point du Jour après l'entrée de l'armée de versailles, mai 1871 watercolour - L'Hôtel de ville après l'incendie, mai 1871 watercolour, Toilette - Ne reveillez pas un chat qui dort, 1874 Salon,
 L'averse - La petite paresseuse - Première leçon de violon, 1875 Salon,
 La colombe - Portrait de la marquise Ginovi, 1876 Salon,
 Femme arabe - La poupée chinoise, 1877 Salon,
 Portrait de M. de H..., 1878 Salon,
 Portrait de M. B. M... - Veilleuse, 1879 Salon,
 Portrait de M. S... - Portrait, 1880 Salon,
 Le repas chez le pharisien, 1881 Salon,
 Amours en chasse - Au Prado, Marseille, 1882 Salon.

Galerie

References

Bibliography 
 Émile Bellier de La Chavignerie, Dictionnaire général des artistes de l'École française depuis l'origine des arts du dessin jusqu'à nos jours : architectes, peintres, sculpteurs, graveurs et lithographes, tome 2, Librairie Renouard, Paris, 1885 (lire en ligne)
 Geneviève Lacambre, Jacqueline de Rohan-Chabot, Le Musée du Luxembourg en 1874, Éditions des Musées Nationaux, Paris, 1974

External links 
 Archives nationales : Jules Richomme
 Base Joconde : Jules Richomme

19th-century French painters
1818 births
1903 deaths
Painters from Paris